Gregorio Forbicini (died 1579) was a Roman Catholic prelate who served as Bishop of Strongoli (1572–1579).

Biography
On 23 January 1572, Gregorio Forbicini was appointed during the papacy of Pope Pius V as Bishop of Strongoli.
On 27 January 1572, he was consecrated bishop by Giulio Antonio Santorio, Archbishop of Santa Severina, with Thomas Goldwell, Bishop of Saint Asaph, and Giuseppe Pamphilj, Bishop of Segni, serving as co-consecrators. 
He served as Bishop of Strongoli until his death in 1579.

See also 
Catholic Church in Italy

References

External links and additional sources
 (for Chronology of Bishops) 
 (for Chronology of Bishops) 

16th-century Italian Roman Catholic bishops
Bishops appointed by Pope Pius V
1579 deaths